Marian Emily White (28 August 1921 — 31 October 1975) was an American archaeologist and university professor. During her career, White conducted research on the Neutral Nation, Erie people and the Wenrohronon in the Niagara Frontier. White posthumously won the 1975 Cornplanter Medal.

Early life and education
White was born on 28 August 1921 in Hartland, New York. In 1942, she graduated from Cornell University with a Bachelor of Arts in Classics alongside an anthropology minor. White later completed further education at the University of Michigan with a Master of Arts in 1953 and a Doctor of Philosophy in 1956.

Career
Upon completing her Bachelor of Arts in 1942, White was a clerk in statistics for the Cornell University College of Agriculture and Life Sciences until 1943. During World War II, she worked as a statistician for the United States Army until the end of 1945. After the war, White worked as a tour guide from 1946 to 1952 for the Buffalo Museum of Science and later became a curator for the museum in 1958. White began her anthropology career for the Rochester Museum of Arts and Sciences in 1956 as a researcher before moving to the University of Buffalo in 1959. At the university, she continued her research before becoming a lecturer in 1960 and professor in 1968.

Outside of education, White was an archaeologist studying the Iroquois of the Niagara Frontier from the late 1950s to late 1970s. She conducted excavations of archaeological sites determining the history of the Neutral Nation, Erie people and the Wenrohronon. Throughout her career, some of her investigations included the Van Son Cemetery in Grand Island, New York and the Kleis Site. At the end of her career, she created the New York Archaeological Council and served as president from 1972 to 1974.

Awards and honours
In 1975, White was posthumously awarded the Cornplanter Medal. The University of Buffalo established the Marian E. White Research Museum in 1979.

Death
White died on 31 October 1975 from cancer.

References

1921 births
1975 deaths
Academics from New York (state)
American women academics
Deaths from cancer in the United States
Place of death missing
Cornell University alumni
University of Michigan alumni
American women archaeologists
University at Buffalo faculty
20th-century American archaeologists
20th-century American women